Cyprus participated in the Junior Eurovision Song Contest 2009 which took place in Kyiv, Ukraine. Rafaella Kosta represented the country with the song "Thalassa, ilios, aeras, fotia".

Before Junior Eurovision

National final
The final was held on 3 October 2009, hosted by Grigoriadis Christos and Mary Kanther. The winner was chosen by a 50/50 combination of votes from a professional jury (which included Christina Metaxa who represented Cyprus in the Eurovision Song Contest 2009) and public televoting.

At Junior Eurovision

Voting

Notes

References 

Cyprus
2009
Junior Eurovision Song Contest